Football Club de Nantes (Gallo: Naunnt), commonly referred to as FC Nantes or simply Nantes, is a French association football club based in Nantes, Pays de la Loire. During the 2016–17 campaign, they competed in the following competitions: Ligue 1, the Coupe de France and the Coupe de la Ligue.

Players

First team squad

French teams are limited to four players without EU citizenship. Hence, the squad list includes only the principal nationality of each player; several non-European players on the squad have dual citizenship with an EU country. Also, players from the ACP countries—countries in Africa, the Caribbean, and the Pacific that are signatories to the Cotonou Agreement—are not counted against non-EU quotas due to the Kolpak ruling.

Transfers

Summer 

In:

Out:

Winter 

In:

Out:

Competitions

Ligue 1

League table

Results summary

Matches

Coupe de France

Coupe de la Ligue

Reference

External links 
FC Nantes at UEFA

FC Nantes seasons
Nantes